TELC may refer to:

 Telč, a town in southern Moravia, in the Czech Republic
 The European Language Certificates or TELC, language exam